The Sarawak surili (Presbytis chrysomelas) is a species of primate in the family Cercopithecidae. It is endemic to the southeast Asian island of Borneo, where it is distributed north of the Kapuas River in Kalimantan, Indonesia, the Malaysia states of Sarawak and Sabah, and in Brunei. Its taxonomy is complex and disputed, and it has been considered a subspecies of P. femoralis or P. melalophos. The Sarawak surili was formerly considered common, but has declined drastically due to persecution and habitat loss, and as of 2008 is only known from five sites with a combined population of 200–500 individuals. Consequently, it is believed to be one of the rarest primates in the world, and has been rated as critically endangered by IUCN.

References

Sarawak surili
Endemic fauna of Borneo
Mammals of Borneo
Mammals of Brunei
Mammals of Malaysia
Critically endangered fauna of Asia
Sarawak surili
Primates of Indonesia
Taxa named by Salomon Müller
Taxa named by Hermann Schlegel